Sam "Rat" Cordingley (born 20 March 1976 in Sydney, New South Wales) is a former Australian rugby union footballer and member of the Wallabies. Before retirement he played for the Melbourne Rebels. He was educated at the St Patrick's Marist College, Dundas.

Career
He played junior rugby for Dundas Valley. He also played for the
Eastwood Rugby Club in Sydney, and made his debut for Queensland against Auckland in 1999. Cordingley made his Super 12 debut for the Queensland Reds that season in a match against the Wellington Hurricanes.

The following season he was called up to the Wallabies squad and made his debut against Argentina. He went back at the Reds after three seasons in Europe with Welsh side Swansea and Grenoble of France.

After playing for the Reds in 2006, he was selected for the Wallabies squad. For the European winter season 2008–09, he returned to FC Grenoble,
in the French Pro D2. The Melbourne Rebels signed Cordingley as a foundation member of their Super Rugby franchise 3 April 2010. However, he missed several games early in the 2011 Super Rugby season due to a hip injury.

After retirement
Cordingley remained with the Rebels after the 2011 season. In 2012, he was 'Player Recruitment Manager', first point of contact for prospective Rebels players, and continued as 'list manager' in 2013. Early in 2014 Cordingley became General Manager of Rugby Operations at QRU.

References

External links
 Rebels Media Unit news release, 17 February, 2011

1976 births
Australia international rugby union players
Australian rugby union players
Brothers Old Boys players
ACT Brumbies players
Living people
Melbourne Rebels players
Queensland Reds players
FC Grenoble players
Rugby union scrum-halves
Rugby union players from Sydney
Expatriate rugby union players in France
Expatriate rugby union players in Wales
Swansea RFC players